The Chalkuyruk is a river in Osh Region of Kyrgyzstan. It is a right tributary of the Ak-Buura.

References 

Rivers of Kyrgyzstan